Liivi River is a river in Lääne County, Estonia. The river is 51.1 km long and basin size is 252.7 km2. It runs into Kasari River.

References

Rivers of Estonia
Lääne County